Liz is a female name of Hebrew origin, meaning "God's Promise". It is also a short form of Elizabeth, Elisabeth, Lisbeth, Lizanne, Liszbeth, Lizbeth, Lizabeth, Lyzbeth, Lisa, Lizette, Alyssa, and Eliza.

People
 Liz Balmaseda (born 1959), Pulitzer Prize-winning journalist
 Liz Bonnin (born 1976), Irish television presenter
 Liz Brown (politician), American politician first elected to the Indiana Senate in 2014
 Liz Brown, backing vocalist for Wheatus
 Liz Claiborne (fashion designer) (1929–2007)
 Liz Fraser, stage name of English actress Elizabeth Joan Winch (1930–2018)
 Liz Friedman, American television producer and television writer
 Liz Hyder, English author
 Liz Kershaw (born 1958), English radio broadcaster
 Liz Kendall (born 1971), British politician
 Liz Krueger (born 1957), American politician, member of the New York State Senate since 2002
 Liz Lochhead (born 1947), Scottish poet, playwright, translator and broadcaster
 Liz Mace, half of the American country/pop duo Megan and Liz
 Liz McClarnon (born 1981), English pop singer, dancer and television presenter
 Liz Mills, Australian basketball coach
 Liz Phair (born 1967), American singer, songwriter and guitarist
 Liz Sandals (born c. 1947), Canadian politician elected in 2003
 Liz Saville Roberts (born 1965), Welsh politician and Member of Parliament
 Elizabeth Sharman (born 1957), British former slalom and sprint canoeist
 Liz Smith (actress) (1921–2016) English character actress
 Liz Smith (journalist) (1923–2017), American gossip columnist
 Elizabeth Taylor (1932–2011), American actress, also known as Liz Taylor
 Liz Torres (born 1947), American actress, singer and comedian
 Liz Truss (born 1975), Prime Minister of the United Kingdom for 50 days in 2022
 Liz White (actress) (born 1979), English actress
 Liz White (animal rights) (born c. 1950), Canadian animal rights activist
Liz Mitchell (born 1952), former Boney M Lead singer and vocalist
Liz (musician) (born 1987), American singer and actress

Fictional characters
 Liz Adams, on the American television series Dallas
 Liz Allan, a Marvel Comics character
 Liz Burton, on the British soap opera Hollyoaks
 Liz Chandler, on the soap opera Days of Our Lives
 Liz Lemon, main character of the American television series 30 Rock
 Liz McDonald, on the British soap opera Coronation Street
 Liz Shaw, on the British science fiction television series Dr. Who
 Liz, a character from the video games series Crash Bandicoot, first introduced in Crash Team Racing.

Hypocorisms
Lists of people by nickname
Feminine given names